Chanchal subdivision is an administrative subdivision of the Malda district in the Indian state of West Bengal.

Geography
Chanchal subdivision covers the Tal, one of the three physiographic sub-regions of the district. The Tal region gradually slopes down towards the south-west and merges with the Diara sub-region… (it) is strewn with innumerable marshes, bils and oxbow lakes.”

Subdivisions
Malda district is divided into two administrative subdivisions:

Administrative units
Chanchal subdivision has 4 police stations, 6 community development blocks, 6 panchayat samitis, 49 gram panchayats, 524 mouzas, 508 inhabited villages and 1 census town. The census town is: Chanchal. The subdivision has its headquarters at Chanchal.

Police stations
Police stations in Chanchal subdivision have the following features and jurisdiction:

Blocks
Community development blocks in Chanchal subdivision are:

Gram panchayats
The subdivision contains 49 gram panchayats under 6 community development blocks:

 Chanchal I block consists of eight gram panchayats, viz. Alihanda, Chanchal, Kharba, Makdampur, Bhagabanpur, Kaligram, Mahanandapur and Motiharpur.
 Chanchal II block consists of seven gram panchayats, viz. Bhakri, Dhangara–Bishanpur, Gourhanda, Kshempur, Chandrapara, Jalalpur and Malatipur.
 Ratua I block consists of ten gram panchayats, viz. Baharal, Chandmoni–II, Mahanandatola, Bhado, Bilaimari, Debipur, Ratua, Chandmoni–I, Kahala and Samsi.
 Ratua II block consists of eight gram panchayats, viz. Araidanga, Paranpur, Pukhuria, Sreepur–I, Maharajpur, Peerganj, Sambalpur and Sreepur–II.
 Harishchandrapur I block consists of seven gram panchayats, viz. Bhingole, Harishchandrapur, Kusidha, Rashidabad, Barui, Mahendrapur and Tulsihatta.
 Harishchandrapur II block consists of nine gram panchayats, viz. Daulatpur, Malior–I, Sadlichak, Doulatnagar, Malior–II, Sultannagar, Islampur, Mashaldaha and Valuka.

Education
Malda district had a literacy rate of 61.73% (for population of 7 years and above) as per the census of India 2011. Malda Sadar subdivision had a literacy rate of 63.76% and Chanchal subdivision 57.68%.

Given in the table below (data in numbers) is a comprehensive picture of the education scenario in Malda district for the year 2013-14:

Note: Primary schools include junior basic schools; middle schools, high schools and higher secondary schools include madrasahs; technical schools include junior technical schools, junior government polytechnics, industrial technical institutes, industrial training centres, nursing training institutes etc.; technical and professional colleges include engineering colleges, medical colleges, para-medical institutes, management colleges, teachers training and nursing training colleges, law colleges, art colleges, music colleges etc. Special and non-formal education centres include sishu siksha kendras, madhyamik siksha kendras, centres of Rabindra mukta vidyalaya, recognised Sanskrit tols, institutions for the blind and other handicapped persons, Anganwadi centres, reformatory schools etc.

Educational institutions
The following institutions are located in the Chanchal subdivision:
Samsi College was established at Samsi in 1968. 
Chanchal College was established at Chanchal in 1969.
Harishchandrapur College was established at Pipla Kasimpur, Harishchandrapur, in 2008.

Healthcare
The table below (all data in numbers) presents an overview of the medical facilities available and patients treated in the hospitals, health centres and sub-centres in 2014 in Malda district.  
 

.* Excluding nursing homes

Medical facilities
Medical facilities available in Chanchal subdivision are as follows:
Hospitals: (Name, location, beds)
Chanchal Subdivisional Hospital, Chanchal, 100 beds
Rural Hospitals: (Name, block, location, beds)
Harishchandrapur Rural Hospital, Harishchandrapur I CD Block, Harishchandrapur, 65 beds
Ratua Rural Hospital, Ratua I CD Block, Ratua, 30 beds
Araidanga Rural Hospital, Ratua II CD Block, Araidanga, 30 beds
Masaldabazar Rural Hospital, Harishchandrapur II CD Block, Mashaldaha PO Kariali, 30 beds 
Malatipur Rural Hospital, Chanchal II, Malatipur, 30 beds
Primary Health Centres: (CD Block-wise)(CD Block, PHC location, beds)
Ratua I CD Block: Debipur (10), Mahanandatola (10), Samsi (10)
Ratua II CD Block: Khailsona (Sultanganj PHC) (6), Kumarganj (10)
Harishchandrapur I CD Block: Vingal (Bhingola PHC) (4), Boroi (6), Khushida (10)
Harishchandrapur II CD Block: Bhaluka Bazar (Bhaluka PHC) (10), Hadamnagar (6)
Chanchal I CD Block: Kharba (10), Singia (Nadishik PHC) (10)
Chanchal II CD Block: Chandrapara (4), Chorolmoni (Khempur PHC) (10)

Electoral constituencies
Lok Sabha (parliamentary) and Vidhan Sabha (state assembly) constituencies in Chanchal subdivision were as follows:

References

Subdivisions of West Bengal
Subdivisions in Malda district
Malda district